Esofea, Wisconsin is an unincorporated community in the town of Jefferson in Vernon County, Wisconsin, United States located along County Road B.

History
In the early 1900s Esofea was a stopping point for travelers on horse going between Viroqua and La Crosse. The community had a creamery, general store, school house, and post office. Most were destroyed in the early 1990s to make way for road construction along County Road B. The church, Bethany Lutheran, and a park, Rentz Memorial Park (commonly called Esofea Park), still exist. Two main roads run through the community, County Road B and Park Road.

A tornado landed near Esofea on August 18, 2005 at the time of The Wisconsin Tornado Outbreak of August 2005.

References

Unincorporated communities in Vernon County, Wisconsin
Unincorporated communities in Wisconsin